Marquis Xi of Jin, ancestral name Ji (姬), given name Situ (司徒), was the seventh ruler of the state of Jin during the Western Zhou Dynasty. After his father Marquis Jing of Jin died, he ascended the throne of Jin.

In 823 BC, the 18th year of his reign, he died and his son Ji, ascended the throne as the next ruler of Jin: Marquis Xian of Jin.

References

Monarchs of Jin (Chinese state)
823 BC deaths
9th-century BC Chinese monarchs
Year of birth unknown